The  is an electric multiple unit (EMU) train type that was operated by the Tokyo subway operator Tokyo Metropolitan Bureau of Transportation (Toei) on the Toei Shinjuku Line in Tokyo, Japan, from 1978 until 2018.

Operations

Formations
By April 2017, the fleet consisted of five eight-car sets (sets 10-240 to 10-280) with six motored (M) cars and two trailer (T) cars, formed as shown below, with car 1 at the Shinjuku end.

 "xx" corresponds to the set number.
 Cars 3 and 7 were each fitted with two lozenge-type pantographs, and car 5 has one.

Interior
Passenger accommodation consisted of longitudinal bench seating throughout. Wheelchair spaces were added when the original six-car sets were lengthened to eight-car sets.

History
The prototype set, 10-010, was built in 1971, and initially tested on the Toei Mita Line.

Refurbishment commenced in fiscal 2009. This consisted of adding external speakers, replacing the original roller blind destination indicators with LED indicators, moving the body side destination indicators from the ends to a central position, and adding interior passenger information displays.

In 2005 and 2006, the 10-xx7 and 10-xx8 cars of sets 10-010 to 10-180 were refurbished and reformed with new driving cars to become 10-300R series. These cars were built between 1986 and 1989 as batches 3 and 5 to lengthen original 6-car sets to 8 cars, and so were still relatively new compared to the rest of the cars in the sets in which they were contained. 

The final set, 10-280, was retired on 11 February 2018.

Build details
Source:

The original six-car sets were later lengthened to eight cars with the addition of pairs of 3rd-batch (14 vehicles built in 1986 by Hitachi) and 5th-batch (22 vehicles built between 1988 and 1989 by Kawasaki Heavy Industries) cars.

References

Electric multiple units of Japan
Toei Subway
Hitachi multiple units
Kawasaki multiple units
Train-related introductions in 1978
Kinki Sharyo multiple units
Tokyu Car multiple units
1500 V DC multiple units of Japan
Alna Koki rolling stock